Ahmed Ayash (born 1 January 1994) is a Yemeni judoka who competes in the under 73 kg category.

He has represented Yemen in kurash, and ju-jitsu as well as judo, in which he was selected to compete at the delayed 2020 Summer Games in Tokyo, where he was drawn in his first match against Akil Gjakova.

References

External links
 

1994 births
Living people
Yemeni male judoka
Olympic judoka of Sudan
Judoka at the 2020 Summer Olympics
Kurash practitioners